Pir Alilu (also Romanized as Pīr ‘Alīlū; also known as Pīr ‘Alī) is a village in Arshaq-e Markazi Rural District, Arshaq District, Meshgin Shahr County, Ardabil Province, Iran. At the 2006 census, its population was 68, in 16 families.

References 

Towns and villages in Meshgin Shahr County